Tecmerium anthophaga is a moth in the family Blastobasidae. It is found in France, Portugal and Spain, as well as on Corsica and Sardinia.

The wingspan is 14–16 mm.

References

External links
 Images representing Tecmerium anthophaga at Consortium for the Barcode of Life

Moths described in 1870
Blastobasidae
Moths of Europe